Dimitrios Komesidis (Greek: Δημήτριος Κομεσίδης; born 2 February 1988) is a Greek professional footballer who plays as a defender for Enosi Alexandroupoli.

He has previously played for Skoda Xanthi in the Greek Super League and for Enosi Thraki and Panetolikos in the Gamma Ethniki.

References

1988 births
Living people
Greek footballers
Association football defenders
Athlitiki Enosi Larissa F.C. players
Xanthi F.C. players
Panetolikos F.C. players
OFI Crete F.C. players
Footballers from Alexandroupolis